Bankot Village is a town and a Panchayat in Sehore district in the Indian state of Madhya Pradesh. Bakot Village is a major agricultural production area in Madhya Pradesh. Earlier. India census,

References 

Villages in Sehore district
Cities and towns in Sehore district